Mirko Jović (Serbian Cyrillic: Мирко Јовић; born 13 August 1959, in Zemun) is a Serbian politician who stood for president of Serbia in the 2004 Serbian presidential election for the Radical Party of People, Serbia, Diaspora and European Bloc. He lives in Belgrade.

Political career
Together with Vuk Drašković and Vojislav Šešelj, Jović founded the Serbian National Renewal party (SNO) in 1989. However, the trio soon found themselves at political crossroads and their party disintegrated into three pieces by 1990. Jović kept the SNO, Šešelj formed the Serbian Radical Party and Drašković formed the Serbian Renewal Movement. The unpopularity of the Jović's nationalist agenda was most markedly shown in Vojvodina, his home province.

This animosity towards Serbian National Renewal ideology culminated in spontaneous mass beating of Jović and the leadership of the party during the party meeting in city of Vrbas in 1991.

He was a volunteer soldier in the Bosnian War, where he was the leader of the White Eagles militia and called for "‘a Christian, Orthodox Serbia with no Muslims and no unbelievers". In the 2004 Serbian presidential election he won 5,546 votes or 0.18% of the votes.

Notes

1959 births
Living people
People from Zemun
Candidates for President of Serbia
Serbian National Renewal politicians
Serbian people of Bosnia and Herzegovina descent
Serbian nationalists